AMX-10 may refer to:
 AMX-10P, a French infantry fighting vehicle
 AMX-10 RC, a French armoured fighting vehicle